Indoor athletics at the 2007 Asian Indoor Games was held in Macau East Asian Games Dome, Macau, China from 30 October to 1 November 2007.

Medalists

Men

Women

Medal table

Results

Men

60 m
30 October

Round 1

Semifinals

Final

400 m

Round 1
30 October

Semifinals
31 October

Final
31 October

800 m

Round 1
31 October

Final
1 November

1500 m

Round 1
30 October

Final
31 October

3000 m
1 November

60 m hurdles

Round 1
31 October

Final
1 November

4 × 400 m relay

Round 1
31 October

Final
1 November

High jump

Qualifying
30 October

Final
1 November

Pole vault
30 October

Long jump
31 October

Triple jump
1 November

Shot put
1 November

Heptathlon
31 October – 1 November

Women

60 m
30 October

Round 1

Final

400 m

Round 1
30 October

Final
31 October

800 m

Round 1
31 October

Final
1 November

1500 m
31 October

3000 m
1 November

60 m hurdles
30 October

4 × 400 m relay

1 November

High jump
31 October

Pole vault

31 October

Long jump
1 November

Triple jump
30 October

Shot put
31 October

Pentathlon
30 October

References
 2007 Asian Indoor Games official website
Krishnan, Ram. Murali (2007-10-30). Francis secures 60m title in 6.54 – 2nd Asian Indoor Games, 1st Day. IAAF. Retrieved on 2014-02-18.
Krishnan, Ram. Murali (2007-10-31). Asian champion Paulose heads Indian success - Asian Indoor Games, 2nd day. IAAF. Retrieved on 2014-02-18.
Krishnan, Ram. Murali (2007-11-01). Kazakh quartet betters Asian relay record – 2nd Asian Indoor Games, Final day. IAAF. Retrieved on 2014-02-18.

2007 Asian Indoor Games events
A
2007